Flat Rock Assembly Plant, formerly known as Ford's Michigan Casting Center (MCC) (1972–1981), Mazda Motor Manufacturing USA (1987–1992) and AutoAlliance International (1992–2012), is a Ford Motor Company assembly plant located at  Drive in Flat Rock, Michigan in Metro Detroit.

The plant currently comprises  of production space and employs 3,510 hourly workers and 140 salaried workers — and currently manufactures the Ford Mustang.

History

1972 to 1991

Following three years of work and the largest single investment by Ford, the Michigan Casting Center (MCC) opened in January 1972, at the time one of the most technologically advanced casting facilities in the world.  Despite the sizable capital investment, frequent union labor problems and work injuries  and declining demand for the V8 engine blocks produced there led the facility's closure in 1981.

A worker, Robert Williams, was killed by an industrial robot arm on January 25, 1979. He is the first known human to be killed by a robot.

Mazda Motor Corporation started construction of a new building on the site of the Michigan Casting Center in 1985 and cars started production at Mazda Motor Manufacturing USA in September 1987 with the Mazda MX-6 and Ford Probe coupes. In 1991 the plant had 3,600 employees, including 250 Japanese employees.

1992 to 2011
Ford repurchased a 50% share in the plant on April 15, 1992, and it officially became a joint-venture and was renamed AutoAlliance International on July 1, 1992.   The plant began production of all models of the Mazda 626 sold in America starting in 1993.  During this era, Deepak Ahuja was Chief Financial Officer of the joint venture. The Ford Contour-derived Mercury Cougar was produced at the plant from 1998 to 2002. Production of North American Mazda 6 began in the 2003 model year, followed by the Ford Mustang starting in 2005.

From 2012
The last Mazda 6 rolled off the line on Friday, August 24, 2012, with Mazda discontinuing production on American soil, effectively ending the 20 year joint-venture between Mazda and Ford. Mazda moved production of the Mazda 6 back to the Hofu factory in Japan and opened a new factory in Salamanca, Mexico to build the Mazda 2 and Mazda 3 subcompact and compact cars.

On September 10, 2012, Ford Motor Company re-took full management control of the plant, renaming it the Ford Flat Rock Assembly Plant, and confirming $555 million in investments designed to retool the plant for the production of the 2013 Ford Fusion midsize sedan.

On July 15, 2015, Ford confirmed that the new 2017 Lincoln Continental sedan would be produced at the Flat Rock plant starting in 2016.

On January 3, 2017, Ford announced that it will begin manufacturing an electric small SUV by 2020, and a high passenger volume autonomous vehicle designed for commercial ride hailing or ride sharing by 2021, both to be built at Flat Rock.

Ford reduced production of the plant from two shifts to one due to lower demand for the Ford Mustang and especially the Lincoln Continental. Over 1,000 workers were laid off in April 2019, including almost 500 temporary workers.

In March 2019, Ford announced change of its plan, production of battery-electric vehicle would not start until 2023.

Products

Current
Ford Mustang (2005–present)

Past
Lincoln Continental (2017–2020)
Ford Fusion (2013–2016)
Mazda 6 (2003–2012)
Mercury Cougar (1999–2002)
Mazda 626 (1990–2002)
Ford Probe (1989–1997)
Mazda MX-6 (1988–1997)

References

Further reading
 Fucini, Joseph J. Working for the Japanese. Simon & Schuster, June 30, 2008. , 9781439106488.
The section starting at p. 101 discusses Japanese employees from Mazda working in the Flat Rock Assembly Plant along with Americans in the 1980s.

Ford factories
Mazda factories
Joint ventures
Motor vehicle assembly plants in Michigan
Buildings and structures in Wayne County, Michigan
1972 establishments in Michigan